Ernő Grünbaum (29 March 1908, in Nagyvárad – between December 1944 and April 1945, in Mauthausen) was a Transylvanian-Hungarian painter, graphic artist, lithographer and illustrator. He worked in a variety of styles, including Art Nouveau, Expressionism and Cubism.

Biography 
His father's death left the family in severe financial distress and he was unable to take art lessons, although he displayed considerable talent for drawing. Initially he worked as a tanner, then as a carpenter. This was followed by an apprenticeship to a copper engraver. In 1927, he found employment with the Sonnenfeld publishing company, where he learned typography. While there, he met and befriended Alex Leon, an Expressionist graphic artist who introduced him to the trends in modern art.

His first exhibition was at the Journalists' Club in his home town. Shortly after, he participated in creating the "". His first solo exhibition came in March 1936. Over the next few years, he advertised in Budapest as a draftsman and lithographer. In addition to his paintings, he designed the covers and title pages for several books.

In May 1944, he and his colleague,  were transported to Mauthausen Concentration Camp. He was put to death there sometime between then and the camp's liberation by the United States Army a year later. The exact number of works he created is unknown, but it is believed that the great majority of them were destroyed during the war.

References

Further reading
 Maria Zintz, Artiștii plastici din nordul Transilvaniei victime ale holocaustului. pgs. 167–188, Editura Arca House, 2007 .

External links

 "Jews in Oradea" @ Tikvah. Includes biographical notes on Elefánt and Barát with samples of their work.

20th-century Romanian painters
20th-century Hungarian painters
Jewish painters
Romanian Jews
Hungarian Jews who died in the Holocaust
1908 births
1940s deaths
Year of death uncertain
Hungarian people who died in Mauthausen concentration camp
Hungarian people executed in Nazi concentration camps
Romanian people who died in Nazi concentration camps
Romanian Jews who died in the Holocaust
Romanian people executed by Nazi Germany